The 1948 Minnesota lieutenant gubernatorial election took place on November 2, 1948. Incumbent Lieutenant Governor C. Elmer Anderson of the Republican Party of Minnesota defeated Minnesota Democratic-Farmer-Labor Party challenger John T. McDonough.

Results

External links
 Election Returns

Lieutenant Gubernatorial
1948

Minnesota